Gum turpentine may refer to:
 Oleoresin of the pine tree, also known as crude turpentine
 Oil of turpentine obtained from pine gum (oleoresin)